Daniel Peaslee (February 28, 1773 – December 3, 1827) was an American businessman, politician and judge.  An early settler of Washington, Vermont, he served as chief judge of the Orange County Court despite not having been trained as a lawyer.  Peaslee also served as a member of Vermont's Governor's Council, Orange County Sheriff and Washington's member of the Vermont House of Representatives.

Early life
Daniel Peaslee was born in Plaistow, New Hampshire on February 28, 1773, one of several children born to Reuben Peaslee and Judith (Noyes) Peaslee.  He was raised and educated in New Hampshire, and moved to Washington, Vermont in 1795.  He became a successful merchant and tavern keeper, and was active in the town's Methodist society.

Career
Besides keeping a tavern and store, Peaslee was active in politics and government.  A member of the Democratic-Republican Party, he represented Washington in the Vermont House of Representatives from 1802 to 1807, 1813 to 1816, and in 1826.

Peaslee served as sheriff of Orange County from 1807 to 1812.  From 1812 to 1816 he served as chief judge of the Orange County Court.  In 1814, Peaslee was a delegate to the Vermont constitutional convention.  From 1816 to 1819, Peaslee was a member of the Vermont Governor's Council.

Death and burial
Peaslee died in Washington on December 3, 1827.  He was buried in Washington's North Cemetery (now called Maple Hill).

Family
In 1795, Peaslee married Elizabeth Hall, with whom he had two children.  In 1822, daughter Judith (1796-1865) married Stephen Burton (1796-1886).  Son James Peaslee (1799-1822) attended the University of Vermont and died at age 22.

Following his first wife's death, in 1822, Peaslee married Lucy Pepper (1805-1833), who at age 17 was 32 years younger than him.  They were the parents of three children: Lucy (1824-1900), the wife of Benjamin Franklin Dickinson (1819-1887), who served as deputy sheriff and sheriff of Orange County; Daniel (1827-1854), who attended Norwich University, married Lucia Tappan (1826-1906) of Newbury, Vermont, and served as Newbury's postmaster; and Laura (1825-1885), the wife of Reverend Alonzo Webster (1818-1887).  In 1829, Lucy Pepper Peaslee married George W. West of Washington.

References

Sources

Books

Internet

Newspapers

1773 births
1827 deaths
People from Plaistow, New Hampshire
People from Washington, Vermont
Vermont Democratic-Republicans
Vermont sheriffs
Vermont state court judges
Members of the Vermont House of Representatives
Burials in Vermont
19th-century American politicians